Transport in Beirut consists of urban buses, minibuses and taxis, as well as interurban and international buses and air service.

Urban

Buses
The Lebanese Commuting Company (LCC) is a privately owned company and offers one of a handful of intercity public transport options available in Beirut. There are several LCC bus routes that cover much of the central areas as well as some suburban areas. LCC also offers prepaid cards. A yellow card is a continually rechargeable card, and a red card is an unlimited monthly card.

Government-owned buses are managed by le Office des Chemins de Fer et des Transports en Commun (OCFTC), or the "Railway and Public Transportation Authority" in English. OCFTC operates several bus lines throughout Beirut.

There are also private vans that serve as minibuses. Some of them run on official lines, but most run on additional routes. They usually are without any numbers. To know if a bus is going to a certain destination, people stop it and ask the driver.

Unfortunately, there are no official bus lines printed or online. The Beirut transport map on OpenStreetMap is the most accurate map available as of June 2015.

Taxis and Uber
Apart from buses, taxis are served by either service taxi or taxicab. Yellow taxis also pick passengers from the international airport, but they are extremely expensive and it is better to walk towards the roundabout, 1 km from the airport, and look for a service.

Uber also operates in Beirut.

Service taxis, on the other hand, are a lot cheaper than taxis. However, to avoid misunderstanding, agreement over the pricing should be made before departure.

Intercity

Buses
An overland trans-desert bus service between Beirut, Haifa, Damascus and Baghdad was established by the Nairn Transport Company of Damascus in 1923; the Nairn brothers had established a Beirut to Haifa service in 1920. The closure of the Lebanese-Israeli border makes no buses travel to Haifa any more.

Beirut has frequent bus connections to other cities in Lebanon and major cities in Syria. Buses for northern destinations and Syria leave from Charles Helou Station and Dora whereas buses to the Beqa' and the south leave from Cola.

Ferries

Presently (Jan 2017) major ferry websites list no services to Beirut.

Airport

The main national airport is the Beirut Rafic Hariri International Airport and is located south of Beirut, in Khaldeh. Opened in 1954, the airport was renovated in 1977, and the present runways were rehabilitated between 1982 and 1984.

Seaports

The Port of Beirut is the main port in Lebanon located in northern Beirut, and is one of the largest ports on the Eastern Mediterranean.

References